Oto no Nai Mori (音のない森) (English: Soundless Forest) is the eleventh single by the Japanese pop-rock band Porno Graffitti. It was released on August 6, 2003. Now his is "another one of the Oto no Nai Mori" in to listen continuously for 3 songs. Singles A side single has been recorded is sandwiched between the coupling piece is only this single.

Track listing

References

2003 singles
Porno Graffitti songs